Calotrophon ostrearum, common name the "mauve-mouth drill", is a species of small, predatory sea snail, a marine gastropod mollusk in the family Muricidae, the murex snails or rock snails.

Description

Distribution

References

Muricidae
Gastropods described in 1846